Mark Barnard (born 27 November 1975) is a former professional footballer, who is now retired. Barnard was a forward who converted to left wing back or left-back. An attacking minded left sided player with an excellent left foot and his fitness was amongst the best in the wing back position.

Barnard aka 'Barney' started his career back in July 1994 with Rotherham United as a trainee. After failing to make it into the first team setup, Barnard moved on to Worksop Town.

After impressing during his time with The Tigers, Barnard earned a move to Darlington, where he then went on to make 171 league and cup appearances and scored 4 goals for the club.

Four-seasons later saw Barnard join Doncaster Rovers, before moving on to Northwich Victoria. During this period Barnard made 2 appearances for England C scoring 1 goal.

Barnard later had spells with Worksop Town (second spell), Tamworth, Northwich Victoria (second spell) Alfreton Town and Belper Town.

Honours

As a player
Darlington
Football League Third Division play-offs runner-up: 1996

External links

1975 births
Living people
Footballers from Sheffield
Association football defenders
English footballers
Rotherham United F.C. players
Worksop Town F.C. players
Darlington F.C. players
Doncaster Rovers F.C. players
Northwich Victoria F.C. players
Tamworth F.C. players
Harrogate Town A.F.C. players
Stalybridge Celtic F.C. players
Alfreton Town F.C. players
Belper Town F.C. players
English Football League players